The Straight Mind and Other Essays is a 1992 collection of essays by Monique Wittig.

The collection was translated into French as La pensée straight in 2001. The title essay, "The Straight Mind", was delivered to the Modern Language Association annual convention in 1978.

Summary
In April 1979, Wittig delivered her essay, "The Straight Mind", as the morning keynote address at Barnard College's event, "The Scholar and the Feminist Conference, The Future of Difference". The essay appeared in French in Questions féministes, where the editorial collective, which included Wittig, splintered over "the lesbian question" leading to a dissolution of the collective and end to the publication. It also appeared in English in Feminist Issues.

"One Is Not Born a Woman", delivered in September 1979 at the "30th Anniversary Conference of the Second Sex" held at New York University, takes up the outcomes of Simone de Beauvoir's feminist political visions for lesbians. Wittig writes "Lesbians Are Not Women" under the assumption that the term "woman" is defined by men. Moreover, she compares lesbians to fugitive slaves.

"The Trojan Horse" explains her theory of literature as a "war machine", echoing Gilles Deleuze.

References

1992 non-fiction books
Beacon Press books
Books by Monique Wittig
French essay collections
Lesbian feminist books
Lesbian non-fiction books
Radical feminist books
1990s LGBT literature